Jorge Sánchez may refer to:

Jorge Noceda Sánchez (1925-1987), Dominican painter and diplomat
Jorge Sánchez García (born 1943), Mexican politician
Jorge Luis Sánchez (born 1960), Cuban film director
Jorge Sánchez (basketball) (born 1991), American wheelchair basketball player 
Jorge Sánchez (swimmer) (born 1977), Spanish swimmer
Jorge Sánchez (footballer, born 1979), Salvadoran footballer
Jorge Sánchez Salgado (born 1985), Cuban volleyball player
Jorge Sánchez (footballer, born 1993), Mexican footballer
Canillas (footballer) (Jorge Peláez Sánchez, born 1996), Spanish footballer
Jorge Sánchez (footballer, born 1997), Mexican footballer